Rosalie Tempa Ndah François (born April 15, 1973) is a Beninese football referee.

A hairdresser by profession, she officiated at her first International match in 2003 before going on to referee the 2003 All-Africa Games football final and was an assistant referee at the 2007 FIFA Women's World Cup in China.

Ndah was nominated as one of the best assistant referee's in the 2007 Oscars du football béninois (Beninese football Oscars). She also served as an assistant referee at the Summer Olympics in 2008 and 2012 and at the 2011 FIFA Women's World Cup.

References

1973 births
Living people
Beninese football referees
Women association football referees
FIFA Women's World Cup referees
Hairdressers